This is the List of World War I memorials and cemeteries in Champagne-Ardenne.

The modern-day Champagne-Ardenne, bordering Belgium in northeast France, covers four departments: Aube, Ardennes, Haute-Marne, and Marne. This region saw much fighting in World War I (1914–1918) and many battles, of which arguably the most important were the First Battle of the Marne and the Second Battle of the Marne.  The First Battle of the Marne, also known as the Miracle of the Marne, was fought between 5 and 12 September 1914. The battle effectively ended the month-long German offensive that had opened the war and the counterattack of six French field armies and the British Expeditionary Force (BEF) along the Marne River forced the German Imperial Army to abandon its push on Paris and retreat northeast to the Aisne river, setting the stage for four years of trench warfare on the Western Front

The Second Battle of the Marne (a.k.a. the Battle of Reims), fought from 15 July to 6 August 1918, was the last major German attack of their five-phase Spring Offensive. The German attack failed when an Allied counterattack led by French forces and including several hundred tanks overwhelmed the Germans on their right flank, inflicting severe casualties. The German defeat marked the start of the relentless Allied advance of the Hundred Days Offensive which culminated in the Armistice.

Needing to come to terms with the loss of so many lives in the conflict, particularly those whose remains went unidentified, war memorials – known in France as monuments aux morts, literally "monuments to the dead" – became a focal point and replaced individual graves and gravestones.  Between 1919 and 1926, many thousands of memorials were erected throughout France, including large national monuments, civic memorials, war cemeteries, private memorials, halls and parks.  Ceremonies are often held at the memorials, including those on Armistice Day and the Fêtes de la Victoire.

Battles of the Marne

Memorial to the First Battle of the Marne at Mondemont

Some images from Mondemont

Memorial to the Battles of the Marne at Dormans

Memorial to the Second Battle of the Marne at the Butte de Chalmont

Memorials to the Missing
These battles involved the deaths of many men and there are two major British "Memorials to the Missing" for the men lost whose remains could not be identified. The memorials at La Ferté-sous-Jouarre links to the First Battle of the Marne, and that at Soissons which links to the 1918 battle.

Monuments in Reims and the surrounding area
Reims was a front-line city throughout the four years of the war and suffered bombardment from German artillery. The Reims Cathedral was bombed and damaged on many occasions, and images of it became a rallying icon in the non-German world. Sixty percent of Reims was destroyed during the 1914–1918 war, and 4,567 Reims men were killed in the conflict, with a further 740 civilian casualties.

The monument aux morts in Reims

The Monument aux infirmières de Reims

Monument to the 132nd and 332nd French Infantry Regiments plus the 46th Territorials

Monuments to the 24th, 28th, 133rd and 363rd French Infantry Regiments at Loivre

The German Cemetery at Loivre
The German cemetery at Loivre contains the remains of 4,149 men of whom 1,913 could not be identified and their remains are in an ossuary.

The Monument to the 119th and 319th French Infantry Regiments and the 20th Territorials at Cauroy-lès-Hermonville
This monument is located at Cauroy-lès-Hermonville near Reims. Many men of the 119th had fallen in the Battle of Charleroi on 22 August 1914, one of the battles fought at the beginning of the war and known as the Battles of the Frontiers.
One inscription is from Belgium and pays homage to the men of the 119th (aux frères – their brothers in arms)

British cemetery at Hermonville

Miscellaneous

The monument to the 11th Company of the 72nd Infantry Regiment

Bridge to the 28th Infantry Division (US)

Italian Cemetery at Bligny and the Italian volunteers who fought in France 1914–1915

Memorial to the 1st Loyal North Lancs at Vendresse, Troyon

Cemeteries in Soupir

The Italian Cemetery at Soupir

The Monument to the United States First Division at Buzancy

The area to the east of Reims

The monument aux morts at Sillery

Military cemeteries at Aubérive

Monument to the 103rd French Infantry Regiment

Memorial remembering the "Eugène" trench and the Monument to the 8th Army Corps

The Fort de la Pompelle and the defence of Reims

Monument to the African Soldiers who died 1914–1918

The Blanc Mont American Memorial at Sommepy-Tahure

French Military Cemetery at Sommepy-Tahure

Monument to the 60th French Infantry Regiment at Ville-en-Tardenois

Monument to the 5th and 6th American Marines at Sommepy-Tahure

The German Military Cemetery at Souain-Perthes-les-Hurlus

The Ferme de Navarin Monument

Russian Chapel and Cemetery at Saint-Hilaire-le-Grand

The Cemetery at "Wacques Farm" and the 28th Brigade Memorial

The monument to the four corporals shot at Souain in 1915

The Memorial at Montagne de Bligny

German Cemetery at Saint-Étienne-à-Arnes

Gallery

See also
 World War I memorials
 Monuments aux Morts – greater detail on French war memorials
 List of World War I Memorials and Cemeteries in Alsace
 List of World War I memorials and cemeteries in the Argonne
 List of World War I memorials and cemeteries in Artois
 List of World War I memorials and cemeteries in Flanders
 List of World War I Memorials and Cemeteries in Lorraine
 List of World War I memorials and cemeteries in the Somme
 List of World War I memorials and cemeteries in Verdun
 List of World War I memorials and cemeteries in the area of the St Mihiel salient
 War memorials (Aisne)
 War memorials (Oise)
 War memorials (Eastern Somme)
 War memorials (Western Somme)

References

Buildings and structures in Grand Est
Burials in Grand Est

Tourist attractions in Grand Est
Champagne-Ardennes
Champagne-Ardennes
World War I in Champagne-Ardennes
Champagne-Ardennes
Memorials and Cemeteries in Champagne-Ardennes